The 1973 FIVB Women's World Cup was held on 19–28 October 1973 in Uruguay. It was the first edition of the tournament and is the only edition of the tournament to have been hosted by a country other than Japan.

Results

First round

Pool A

|}

|}

Pool B

|}

|}

Final round

Semifinals

|}

5th–8th semifinals

|}

9th place match

|}

7th place match

|}

5th place match

|}

3rd place match

|}

Final

|}

Final standing

External links
Results

1973 Women
World Cup Women
World Cup Women
1973 FIVB Women's World Cup
October 1973 sports events in South America
Women's volleyball in Uruguay